"Keep On Lovin’ Me" is a song performed by American rhythm and blues group The Whispers; issued as the second single from their fourteenth studio album Love for Love. The song peaked at #4 on the Billboard R&B chart in 1983.

Charts

References

External links
 
 

 

1983 songs
1983 singles
SOLAR Records singles
Song recordings produced by Leon Sylvers III
The Whispers songs